The Turimawiwi River is a river of the Tasman Region of New Zealand's South Island. It flows northwest from the Wakamarama Range 40 kilometres southwest of Cape Farewell.

See also
List of rivers of New Zealand

References

Rivers of the Tasman District
Rivers of New Zealand